Igor Stepanovich Zemlyanoy; born 26 May 1967) is a Kazakhstani retired ice hockey player. During his career he played for several teams in both Russia and Kazakhstan. Zemlyanoy also played for the Kazakhstani national team at the 1998 Winter Olympic Games and multiple World Championships.

Career statistics

Regular season and playoffs

International

References

External links

1967 births
Living people
Avangard Omsk players
Ice hockey players at the 1998 Winter Olympics
Soviet ice hockey defencemen
Kazakhstani ice hockey defencemen
Kazzinc-Torpedo players
Metallurg Magnitogorsk players
Olympic ice hockey players of Kazakhstan
Sportspeople from Oskemen